Canale-di-Verde (French form) or Canale di Verde is a commune in the French department of Haute-Corse, collectivity and island of Corsica.

Administration
Since 2015, Canale-di-Verde is part of the canton of Castagniccia, together with 36 other communes.

Geography
The commune, which culminates at la punta di a Campana, extends between the sea on the one hand and the torrent of Allistro on the other, at the mouth of which is found a ruined Genoese tower of the same name. The reservoir of Peri there is used to irrigate  of vines.

Population

See also
Communes of the Haute-Corse department
Tour d'Alistro - a Genoese tower in the commune

References

Communes of Haute-Corse
Haute-Corse communes articles needing translation from French Wikipedia